Parornix kugitangi is a moth of the family Gracillariidae. It is known from Turkmenistan and Uzbekistan.

References

Parornix
Moths of Asia
Moths described in 1991